This page covers all relevant details regarding PFC Cherno More Varna for all official competitions inside the 2005–06 season. These are A Group and Bulgarian Cup.

Transfers

Summer transfer window 

In:

Out:

Winter transfer window 

In:

Out:

Squad and league statistics

Dimitrov, Ilić, Kunchev, I. Georgiev, Timnev and E. Todorov left the club during a season.

Matches

A Group

League table

Results summary

League performance

Goalscorers in A Group

Bulgarian Cup

References

PFC Cherno More Varna seasons
Cherno More Varna